The Henry Whitfield House is a historic house located in Guilford, Connecticut, down the street from the town green. This house dates from 1639, having been built just before the town of Guilford was settled.   It is the oldest house in Connecticut and the oldest stone house in New England.  The house, with its massive stone walls, also served as a fort to protect the community. Henry Whitfield, for whom the house was built, was a Puritan minister who had come from England to flee religious persecution.  The house was remodeled in 1868 and opened to the public in 1899 as the first museum of the State of Connecticut, the Henry Whitfield State Museum.  The house was restored in 1902–04 and in the 1930s and was declared a National Historic Landmark in 1997.  It was named a State Archeological Preserve in 2006.

Construction
The first settlers of the Guilford colony began construction of their minister's home in September 1639, shortly after their arrival in the area of the future Guilford colony. However, they had begun construction of the house too late in the year, winter weather preventing them from finishing anything more than half of the great hall and north fireplace until the following spring.  By the summer of 1640 the rest of the hall, the second floor, and the attic were completed and the house was inhabited by Whitfield and his family.  Accounts of the construction state that the local Menunkatuck Indians aided the settlers in the construction of the house by transporting stone from nearby quarries to the building site on hand barrows.  The walls of the house were made nearly two feet thick because there was so much stone available for construction.  The original mortar used to cement the stones was composed of yellow clay and crushed oyster shell, a technique developed by the lack of more conventional building materials.  Inside the great hall, the "joists and rafters were hand-hewn oaken timbers; the inside partitions were formed by wide planks of pine or white wood joined with feathered edges."

Purposes
First and foremost, the Whitfield House served as the home for Henry Whitfield, Dorothy Shaeffe Whitfield, and their nine children. The house also served as a place of worship before the first church was built in Guilford, a meetinghouse for colonial town meetings, a protective fort for the settlers in case of attack, and a shelter for travelers between the New Haven and Saybrook colonies.  In addition, the Whitfield House was used by the Roman Catholic community as a chapel in the 1860s before St. George Church was constructed on the Guilford Green. Even after the church was completed many parish meetings were still held in the house. Today, it is a museum, a State Archeological Preserve, a National Historic Landmark, and a site listed on the National Register of Historic Places.

Architecture

The architectural style of the Henry Whitfield house is unique for its time period and location. In that it is styled in the tradition of the estates of northern England and Scotland, rather than the lower English and London style found in the rest of New England. When the first settlers constructed the house, they had built large rooms, ignoring the fact that smaller rooms would be easier to heat.  They also ignored the abundance of wood available to them to construct an easily heated, yet still sturdy, home.

The original floor plan of the house included a kitchen and great hall (which could be divided by partitions into two separate rooms) on the first floor, a stair tower leading to the second floor, three bedroom chambers on the second floor, and a small attic above the chambers. The great hall, which was probably the most used room in the house, is thirty-three feet in length and fifteen feet in width and was built in a perpendicular ell to the rest of the house. This was the room used for church services, town meetings, feasts, and the housing of travelers. The Whitfield family slept on the second floor of the house, with the room directly above the kitchen used for the younger children because it was kept the warmest in the winter by the rising heat from the kitchen fireplace. The original roof had a sixty degree pitch, though it has been steepened during the house's various restorations. In addition, the house was constructed with six fireplaces, the largest of which is ten feet four inches across and is positioned on the north end of the great hall. This fireplace remains mostly unchanged today, other than the addition of an oak mantel and some masonry. The smaller five have been remodeled several times since their original construction.

Henry Whitfield

Henry Whitfield, one of Guilford's founders and its first minister, was born sometime between June 8 and October 1, 1592, in Greenwich in the English county of Kent.[7] His father, Thomas Whitfield, was wealthy and influential during the reigns of James I and Queen Elizabeth and an eminent lawyer in the courts of Westminster [12] in London. Henry's mother, Mildred Manning, was descended from the family of the poet and "Father of English literature" Geoffrey Chaucer.[5]

Henry Whitfield attended New College, Oxford, where he befriended the future founder of the Saybrook colony in Connecticut, George Fenwick.[7] He initially studied law after graduation, but found it undesirable and promptly changed his focus to ministry studies.[5] He was ordained a minister of the Church of England in 1618 and soon took up the post of vicar of St. Margaret's Church in Ockley,Surrey, where he remained for the next 18 years. Contemporaries noted that people throughout the surrounding countryside converged to hear his sermons.  He was known for being dignified, courteous, scholarly, eloquent and gentle and believed to be one of the wealthiest clergymen emigrating to Connecticut. [12]  
 
Whitfield married Dorothy Sheafe who was the daughter of Dr. Edmund Sheafe from the county of Kent.  Henry and Dorothy had nine children together.  It is believed that three of the children died before reaching adulthood. [13] They lived off the estate of Henry's father.[7]  
Under the rule of King Charles I, the Church of England persecuted Separatists and Puritans who opposed the strict rules of the church.  Whitfield's sympathies shifted to the Puritan movement following persecutions ordered by Archbishop William Laud.[9]  Laud established a network to spy on and break up nonconforming religious groups. Whitfield's break from the Church would not be sudden. In 1633 he hosted a meeting in his home in Ockley to persuade John Cotton and Thomas Hooker to try to conform to Laud's dictates so that they could keep their positions in the church. [17]  Ultimately, Henry did not conform to the dictates and religious ceremonies required by Laud and published a book of religious persuasion and instruction entitled “Helps to Stir Up Christian Duties.” [12] Shortly after being censured as a dissident by the High Commission Court in 1638, Whitfield resigned from his post in Ockley.

In early 1639 Whitfield sold his estate and established plans to emigrate to America with his family and followers.  As an active itinerant preacher, Whitfield met many younger nonconformists who agreed with his teachings. Whitfield recruited a group of twenty five families, mostly farmers from Surrey and Kent, to travel to the New Haven colony.  Also among the party was Edward Jones, an indentured builder who, in exchange for passage, agreed to help the newcomers construct houses for three years. George Hubbard, one of the original Guilford settlers, noted that almost all of the founders of Guilford, with the exception of Whitfield, were young men. Dorothy Whitfield's brother Jacob Sheafe and two of her sisters emigrated with them. [12]

Upon arrival in June 1639, Whitfield consulted Fenwick and Reverend John Davenport, founder of the New Haven Colony, and decided to purchase land from the Quinnipiac tribe halfway between the New Haven and Saybrook colonies.[7]  Quinnipiac land stretched from New Haven on the west to Madison on the east and north to Meriden. Each party in the land transaction was ignorant of each other's culture. The indigenous tribal leaders likely viewed the goods that they received as a goodwill gesture from the English. Historian Richard Carlson noted that “for the Quinnipiacs the treaties represented agreements to share uses of the land, not agreements for exclusive ownership of the land itself.” [14]

Whitfield and his followers started establishing the Guilford colony in September.  They began constructing his house, although it was not finished until the following spring due to winter weather conditions.[9] In the early years of the Guilford colony, Whitfield served as both the minister and community leader, delivering sermons, conducting marriage ceremonies as well as settling civil disputes.[7] In 1641 the colony of New Haven expanded to include Guilford as well as several other settlements under the New Haven General Court's jurisdiction.  New Haven was officially recognized as a colony by the English Parliament under Oliver Cromwell. Beginning in 1642 several leaders of the New Haven Colony returned to England to join in the political struggles over religious freedom. [16]

By the late 1640s, Whitfield was reconsidering whether to remain in the New World. Between 1646 and 1648, seven founding members of Guilford, most of them young men, had died.  Political conditions in England had changed. Archbishop Laud, who represented King Charles I's unyielding religious policies was arrested on charges of treason in 1641, and executed on January 10, 1645. [15] By 1650 England had become more tolerant of religious differences and more attractive to New Englanders who were wearying of life in the wilderness. Prominent citizens, many of them clergymen were leaving for the mother country.   Whitfield received invitations to return to England and he subsequently communicated to his parish his intentions to leave. [18] A public meeting was held on February 20, 1649, in Guilford.  Whitfield's reasons for wishing to leave were read in public.  Attendees voted to approve inducements to encourage him to remain, including increasing his salary and exempting his two sons from guard duty (night watches to protect the town) for one year.  In the end Whitfield decided to return in spite of his flock's objections. [12]

It has been speculated Henry Whitfield returned due to the improved political and religious conditions for Puritans under the reign of Oliver Cromwell's reign.   However, factors such as the rigors of colonial life, his age and failing health, and economic hardship may also have factored into Whitfield's decision to leave Guilford.  George Hubbard, a founding member of Guilford observed that Whitfield was not suited to life in the wilderness.  His fragile body could not handle the harsh winters and physical labor and these factors affected his health.  Hubbard noted Whitfield lost money on the Guilford venture and colleagues in England were urging him to return.  Whitfield left the colony and his followers on August 26, 1650. [12] His son John accompanied him. [18]

Dorothy and the majority of their children remained in Guilford.[5]  Dorothy Whitfield continued to live in their stone house in Guilford and looked after their property. Three daughters were married in New England. Three children would ultimately return to England. Whitfield was reinstated in the Church.  He died in 1657 and was buried in Winchester Cathedral on September 17. The entirety of his estate was left to Dorothy who returned to England in 1659. She died in 1669. [13]

Owners and Residents

The first residents of the house were Henry Whitfield, his wife, and their children, for whom the house was originally built.  Throughout their occupancy, they extended their welcome to travelers, church-goers, and the rest of the citizens in the community. When Henry Whitfield returned to England in 1650, his wife, Dorothy, and some of their children continued to live in the house. It is suggested by historical records that during this time John Winthrop the Younger, son of the founder of the Massachusetts Bay Colony and future Governor of Connecticut, expressed interest in purchasing the house. However, he ended up moving to the East Haven colony instead. Upon Whitfield's death in 1657 the ownership was passed on to Dorothy. Before her return to England in 1659, the town of Guilford, led by future Governor of Connecticut, William Leete, and William Chittenden, attempted to purchase the house as a grammar school for the settlement. The transaction never occurred because the town lacked sufficient funds to purchase the house. After much deliberation, in September 1659 the house was sold to a London merchant named Major Robert Thompson. Thompson and his family remained in England throughout most of their ownership, which lasted over a century, renting the house to tenant farmers. The Thompson family sold the house to Wyllys Eliot, a Guilford resident, on October 21, 1772, though Eliot owned the house for less than a month and sold it to Joseph Pynchon on November 6, 1772.  Pynchon used the house as a summer home, but was forced to flee back to England because of his loyalist sympathies at the onset of the American Revolution. Before he left, he sold the house to Jasper Griffing on June 27, 1776, just a week prior to the signing of the Declaration of Independence. Griffing, a patriot from Long Island, was a descendant of the early Guilford leader, William Chittenden.  The Griffing and Chittenden families owned the house for over a century, and during their ownership the remodeling of 1868 occurred. Not until September 28, 1900, did the Whitfield House become the property of the State of Connecticut, when Sarah Brown Cone sold the house and property for $8,500. The purchase was financed by "$3,500 from the State of Connecticut, $3,000 from the town of Guilford, between $500 and $1,000 from residents of Guilford, and as much from the members of the Connecticut Society of the Colonial Dames of America." It was transformed into a museum after several renovations and as of 2021 is operated by the Connecticut Department of Economic and Community Development.

Renovations

The first unofficial renovation and remodeling of the Henry Whitfield House occurred in 1868, under the ownership of the Mary Chittenden. Mrs. Chittenden devoted a great deal of her inheritance from her late husband, Henry Ward Chittenden, to the remodeling and repair of the house. This initial renovation was directed by her son-in-law, Henry D. Cone.  By the year 1868, the house's roof was beginning to cave-in and a great deal of the southern wall had collapsed. Several repairs were necessary in order to make the house habitable. During this time much of the south wall was rebuilt, the south chimney was removed, the roof was rebuilt, and much of the interior walls were re-plastered. However, the house was not completely changed from its original state. Historical accounts from the Library of Congress state, "as much as half of the ancient wall was not disturbed, the larger part of that being north of the door."  In addition, the original foundation of the house remained unaltered.

The second major renovation of the house occurred in 1902, shortly after the museum was opened, led by architectural historian Norman Isham. Isham's main purpose in the restoration was to make the house and museum attractive to visitors and suitable for tours.  His renovation included a re-plastering and mortaring of the walls and ceilings, as well as the remodeling of the five smaller fireplaces of the house. Isham's restoration plan was based on what he stated to be, "tradition, inherent reasonableness, and likeness to old English examples."   His approach led to the criticism of many architectural experts, including the next renovator, J. Frederick Kelly, who believed Isham was more concerned with the aesthetics than the historical accuracy of the house.

Though minor restorations continue today, the most extensive renovation occurred during the 1930s, directed by J. Frederick Kelly. The purpose of this renovation was to conduct archeological and architectural analyses and restore the house to its condition in 1639. Prior to this extensive renovation, Kelly had experience with the house through his conversion of one of the barns on the property to a caretaker's house in 1923.  Kelly's restoration began with the reconstruction of the kitchen in 1930 and the rebuilding of the ell (the wing built perpendicular to the main house) in 1932. The external changes of the house included a steepening of the pitch of the roof, the construction of a chimney at the house's southern end, elimination of the stucco, and the creation of seventeenth century windows with diamond-shaped glass panels held together by lead bars.   Interior restorations included the re-creation of a corner window facing the harbor, the restoration of the stair tower to the second floor, the rebuilding of the second floor (which had been essentially removed sometime during the 1700s), and the reconstruction of the partitions that had been used to separate the great hall into several rooms. The final cost of Kelly's restoration was $26,000, financed by the Federal government and individual patrons of the Colonial Dames of America, and it was completed on October 20, 1937.

Museum

The Henry Whitfield House was formally opened as a museum in 1899, after the first official remodeling was completed, making it Connecticut's first state museum.  The museum is operated by the Connecticut Department of Economic and Community Development. The creation of the museum reflected a trend toward nativism amongst old American families during the immigration influx in the early twentieth century.  Though some of the artifacts in the museum were found in the cellar, many are not original to the house and were gathered from other historic sites of the same time period in order to show visitors what life was like for the early colonists of America. The renovation by J. Frederick Kelly had also restored the house near to the condition it was believed by him to be in when it was first built. On site, visitors are allowed to explore the house through either historian-guided or self-guided tours, as well as through interactive tours online at the museum's webpage. The museum gained national recognition when it was added to the National Register of Historic Places in 1972 and was declared a National Historic Landmark in 1997.

See also
 Oldest buildings in America
 List of the oldest buildings in Connecticut
 List of sites administered by the Connecticut State Historic Preservation Office
 List of National Historic Landmarks in Connecticut
 National Register of Historic Places listings in New Haven County, Connecticut

References

[12] Steiner, Bernard Christian.  A History of the Plantation of Menunkatuck and of the Original Town of Guilford, Connecticut.  Baltimore, The Friedenwald Company, 1897.

[13] Threfall, John Brooks. The Ancestry of Reverend Henry Whitfield (1590-1657) and his wife Dorothy Sheafe (159?-1669) of Guilford, Connecticut. Self-Published, 1989.   accessed 2/13/2021, https://www.familysearch.org/search/catalog/484998?availability=Family%20History%20Library.

[14] Lavin, Lucianne. Connecticut's Indigenous Peoples: What Archaeology, History, and Oral Traditions Teach Us About Their Communities and Cultures. United States, Yale University Press, 2013.
https://www.google.com/books/edition/Connecticut_s_Indigenous_Peoples/T-7eCKy83cEC?hl=en&gbpv=1&bsq=menunkatuck .

[15] Palmer, William G. “Invitation to a Beheading: Factions in Parliament, the Scots, and the Execution of Archbishop William Laud in 1645.”  Historical Magazine of the Protestant Episcopal Church, Vol. 52, No. 1, March, 1983, pp. 17–27, Stable URL: https://www.jstor.org/stable/42973928.

[16] Sletcher, Michael. New Haven: From Puritanism to the Age of Terrorism. Charleston, Arcadia Publishing, 2004. Accessed 2/22/2021, https://www.google.com/books/edition/New_Haven/dW0k9q6oZyoC?hl=en&gbpv=1&dq=New+Haven+From+Puritans+to+the+Age+of+Terrorism&printsec.

 [17] Bremer, Francis J. and Tom Webster. Puritans and Puritanism in Europe and America Volume I.   Santa Barbara, ABC-CLIO, 2005. Accessed 2/22/2021, https://www.google.com/books/edition/Puritans_and_Puritanism_in_Europe_and_Am/EzvHvEDPosQC?hl=en.

[18] Sachse, William L. “The Migration of New Englanders to England, 1640-1660.” The American Historical Review, vol. 53, no. 2, 1948, pp. 251–278. Accessed 2/22/2021, JSTOR, www.jstor.org/stable/1842820. .

External links

 Henry Whitfield Museum, Connecticut Commission on Culture and Tourism
 Henry Whitfield State Museum Virtual Tour
 Henry Whitfield House
 Oldest Stone House in New England: Henry Whitfield Museum

Houses completed in 1639
Houses in Guilford, Connecticut
National Historic Landmarks in Connecticut
Museums in New Haven County, Connecticut
Historic house museums in Connecticut
Houses on the National Register of Historic Places in Connecticut
National Register of Historic Places in New Haven County, Connecticut
Whitfield family residences
1639 establishments in Connecticut
Native American architecture